The 2008 season of the Bhutanese A-Division was the fourteenth recorded season of top-flight football in Bhutan. The league was won by Yeedzin FC, their first ever title, and the first time a team other than Transport United had won the league in five years. Yeedzin qualified as Bhutan's representative in the 2009 AFC President's Cup.

Participating teams
 Choden
 Druk Athletic
 Druk Pol
 Druk Star 
 Rigzung
 Royal Bhutan Army
 Transport United
 Yeedzin

League table
Teams played each other on a home and away basis, there was no relegation or promotion.

References

Bhutan A-Division seasons
Bhutan
Bhutan
1